Exocyst complex component 7 is a protein that in humans is encoded by the EXOC7 gene. It was formerly known as Exo70.

It forms one subunit of the exocyst complex. First discovered in Saccharomyces cerevisiae, this and other exocyst proteins have been observed in several other eukaryotes, including humans. In S. cerevisiae, the exocyst complex is involved in the late stages of exocytosis, and is localised at the tip of the bud, the major site of exocytosis in yeast. It interacts with the Rho3 GTPase. This interaction mediates one of the three known functions of Rho3 in cell polarity: vesicle docking and fusion with the plasma membrane (the other two functions are regulation of actin polarity and transport of exocytic vesicles from the mother cell to the bud). In humans, the functions of this protein and the exocyst complex are less well characterised: this protein is expressed in several tissues and is thought to also be involved in exocytosis.

Interactions 

EXOC7 has been shown to interact with EXOC4 and RHOQ.

References

Further reading 

 
 
 
 
 
 
 
 
 
 
 
 

Protein families